The Hafei Ruiyi is a microvan-derived cabover pickup truck produced by Chinese manufacturer Hafei Motor and developed in partnership with Pininfarina. The Ruiyi is sold in Brazil and Uruguay under the brand Effa Motors.

Overview
The Hafei Ruiyi is essentially the pickup version of the Hafei Zhongyi, with the front end of the cab unit being identical to the microvan.

In December 2007, the Ruiyi was launched in Chile together with the Zhongyi and Lobo. Microvans and their pickup derivates were extremely popular in Chile during the late 1970s and 80's, and are widely known as pan de molde (sliced bread), basically the same name known in China, mian bao che (bread loaf car (van) because of their shape.

The Hafei Ruiyi is sold as a utility truck in the United States by Mag International Inc. The truck is known in the US as T-MAG and/or T-MAG XC. MAG is also the sole developer and provider of an electric version of the truck.

Gallery

See also
 Hafei Zhongyi

References 

Hafei
Microvans
Vans
Pickup trucks
Cab over vehicles
2000s cars
Vehicles introduced in 1999